William Collinson may refer to:
 William Edward Collinson, British linguist
William Robert Collinson (1912–1995), American federal judge